Spruce gum is a chewing material made from the resin of spruce trees.  In North America, spruce resin was chewed by Native Americans, and was later introduced to the early American pioneers and was sold commercially by the 19th century, by John B. Curtis amongst others. It has also been used as an adhesive.  Indigenous women in North America used spruce gum to caulk seams of birch-bark canoes.

Spruce gum has been used medicinally, primarily to heal deep cuts and sores in the Dene culture.  In the 1870s, Sisters of Providence located in Montreal, Canada, developed a spruce gum syrup for treating coughs and bronchitis.

In the 20th century, commercial spruce tree processing turned to paper manufacturing to meet demand from the newspaper industry, thereby reducing the availability of spruce for other purposes, including the production of spruce gum.  Today, it is available in small batches made at home rather than commercially.  It is often flavored with mint or fruit.

References 

Chewing gum
Native American cuisine
Indigenous cuisine in Canada
American confectionery
Canadian confectionery